Carmarthenshire is a large rural county in West Wales. It includes mix of upland and mountainous terrain and  fertile farmland. The western end of the Brecon Beacons National Park lies within the county. Across Carmarthenshire there are a total of 370 Scheduled monuments, which is too many for a single list page. For convenience the list is divided into the 227 prehistoric sites (shown below) and the 143 Roman to modern sites. Included on this page are small number of stone chambered tombs from the Neolithic. There are a large and diverse variety of burial cairns, mounds and barrows, mainly from the Bronze Age, accounting for 197 sites. A further 49 Iron Age sites are mostly defensive sites such as hillforts and enclosures. Carmarthenshire is both a unitary authority and a historic county. Between 1974 and 1996 it was merged with Cardiganshire (now Ceredigion) and Pembrokeshire to form Dyfed.

All the Roman, early medieval, medieval and modern sites are listed at List of Scheduled Roman to modern Monuments in Carmarthenshire

Scheduled Ancient Monuments (SAMs) have statutory protection.  It is illegal to disturb the ground surface or any standing remains. The compilation of the list is undertaken by Cadw Welsh Historic Monuments, which is an executive agency of the National Assembly of Wales. The list of scheduled monuments below is supplied by Cadw with additional material from RCAHMW and Dyfed Archaeological Trust.

Scheduled prehistoric Monuments in Carmarthenshire

See also
List of Cadw properties
List of castles in Wales
List of hill forts in Wales
Historic houses in Wales
List of monastic houses in Wales
List of museums in Wales
List of Roman villas in Wales

References
Coflein is the online database of RCAHMW: Royal Commission on the Ancient and Historical Monuments of Wales, DAT is the Dyfed Archaeological Trust, Cadw is the Welsh Historic Monuments Agency

Carmarthenshire
Buildings and structures in Carmarthenshire